is a Japanese video game composer who is primarily known for his work in shoot 'em up games. He has worked with game companies such as Allumer, NMK, Raizing and Cave. In October 2002, Namiki, Hitoshi Sakimoto, and Masaharu Iwata founded Basiscape. The trio had worked for NMK for sound production under the title "Santarou" before the employment, so he started to assume the handle when appearing on the chiptune scene and performed live at the Japan Chiptune Tour 2004. He is currently the sound director at M2.

Works

Super Space Fortress Macross (1992)
Thunder Dragon 2 (1993)
Bomb Jack Twin (1993)
Super Space Fortress Macross II (1993)
America Oudan Ultra Quiz 4 (1993)
Quiz Panicuru Fantasy (1994)
Zed Blade (1994)
P-47 Aces (1995)
Desert War (1995)
Battle Garegga (1996)
Bloody Roar (1997) - with various others
Shinshuku Taisen: It's a Noni! (1997)
Armed Police Batrider (1998) - with Kenichi Koyano and Hitoshi Sakimoto
Bloody Roar 2 (1999) - with Masaharu Iwata, Kenichi Koyano, and Jin Watanabe
Brave Blade (2000)
DokiDoki Sasete!! (2001)
DoDonPachi DaiOuJou (2002)
Digital Monsters: D Project (2002)
Digi Charat: Digi Communication (2002)
Ketsui: Kizuna Jigoku Tachi (2003)
DoDonPuchi Zero (2003)
Bike Banditz (2003)
Mushihimesama (2004) - with Masaharu Iwata
Digi Communication 2 in 1 Datou! Black Gemagema Dan (2004) - with Masaharu Iwata and Kenichi Koyano
Battle B-Daman (2004) - with Kenichi Koyano, Kimihiro Abe, and Masaharu Iwata
Kuusen II (2004) - with Masaharu Iwata
Fullmetal Alchemist: Dream Carnival (2004) - with Masaharu Iwata and Mitsuhiro Kaneda
Espgaluda II (2005) - with Mitsuhiro Kaneda
Jikuu Bouken Zentrix (2005) - with Masaharu Iwata
Bleach: Heat the Soul (2005) - with Mitsuhiro Kaneda and Yoshihiro Kanata
Bleach: Heat the Soul 2 (2005) - with Mitsuhiro Kaneda, Kimihiro Abe, and Hitoshi Sakimoto
Zoids: Full Metal Crash (2005) - with various others
Metal Slug 6 (2006) - with Mitsuhiro Kaneda
Mushihimesama Futari (2006) - with Kimihiro Abe
Battle Stadium D.O.N (2006) - with Kimihiro Abe, Kenichi Koyano, Masaharu Iwata, and Mitsuhiro Kaneda
Sega Ages 2500 Vol. 28 Tetris Collection (2006) - with Kimihiro Abe
Digimon Savers: Another Mission (2006) - with Hitoshi Sakimoto and Masaharu Iwata
Fantasy Earth: Zero (2006) - with Kenichi Koyano, Hitoshi Sakimoto, and Masaharu Iwata
Bleach: Heat the Soul 3 (2006) - with Mitsuhiro Kaneda, Kimihiro Abe, and Masaharu Iwata
Deathsmiles (2007)
Shijou Saikyou no Deshi Kenichi: Gekitou! Ragnarok Hachikengou (2007) - with Noriyuki Kamikura
Odin Sphere (2007) - with Hitoshi Sakimoto, Masaharu Iwata, Kimihiro Abe, and Mitsuhiro Kaneda
Beatmania IIDX 13: DistorteD (PlayStation 2 version) (2007) - "Shoot 'Em All"
Bleach: Heat the Soul 4 (2007) - with Mitsuhiro Kaneda and Kimihiro Abe
Twinbee Portable (2007)
Eyeshield 21: Field Saikyou no Senshi Tachi (2007) - with Masaharu Iwata, Mitsuhiro Kaneda, Kimihiro Abe, and Noriyuki Kamikura
Opoona (2007) - with Hitoshi Sakimoto, Masaharu Iwata, Mitsuhiro Kaneda, Kimihiro Abe, and Noriyuki Kamikura
Doraemon Wii (2007) - with Masaharu Iwata, Mitsuhiro Kaneda, Kimihiro Abe, and Noriyuki Kamikura
Konami Arcade Collection (2007)
Namco Museum DS (2007)
TwinBee Da!! (PSP Remake) (2007)
Fate/unlimited codes (2008)
DoDonPachi DaiFukkatsu (2008)
Trauma Center: Under the Knife 2 (2008) - with Noriyuki Kamikura
Gradius ReBirth (2008)
Fantasy Zone II: The Tears of Opa-Opa (System 16 remake) (2008)
Contra ReBirth (2009)
Castlevania: The Adventure ReBirth (2009)
Deathsmiles II (2009) - with Noriyuki Kamikura and Yoshimi Kudo
Z.H.P. Unlosing Ranger VS Darkdeath Evilman (2010) - with various others
Busou Shinki: Battle Masters (2010) - with Noriyuki Kamikura, Yoshimi Kudo, and Naoyuki Sato
DoDonPachi DaiFukkatsu: Black Label (2011) - with Yoshimi Kudo, Noriyuki Kamikura, and Azusa Chiba
Otomedius Excellent (2011) - with various others
Tekken: Blood Vengeance (2011) - with various others
Half-Minute Hero: The Second Coming (2011) - with various others
Black Rock Shooter: The Game (2011)
Busou Shinki: Battle Masters Mk. 2 (2011) - "Introduction"
DoDonPachi SaiDaiOuJou (2012)
Kokuga (2012)
Caladrius (2013) - with Yoshimi Kudo and Azusa Chiba
3D OutRun (2014) - "Cruising Line"
Mirror War: Reincarnation of Holiness (2014) - with Maki Kirioka and Motoi Sakuraba
Super Smash Bros. for Wii U (2014) - arrangements with various others
Sega 3D Fukkoku Archives (2014)
Sega 3D Fukkoku Archives 2 (2015)
Sega 3D Fukkoku Archives 3: Final Stage (2015)
Galaxy Voyager (2018) with various others
16bit Rhythm Land (2019) with various others
Gimmick! exAct * Mix (2020) - arrangement
GG Aleste 3 (2020)

References

External links
Official website

1971 births
Chiptune musicians
Japanese composers
Japanese dance musicians
Japanese electronica musicians
Japanese male composers
Japanese techno musicians
Living people
People from Funabashi
Video game composers